Zandspruit is a township in the Region C of the City of Johannesburg Metropolitan Municipality in the Gauteng province of South Africa. It has been the scene of potential opportunities with regards to development by private and public entities. Several complaints against apathy and incompetence on the part of the local municipal authority have been raised and as a result development has slowly occurred.

Over the years  the place has seen development  in various areas. Life quality has gotten better and improved due to  efforts by the members of the community. And this has resulted in teenagers collaborating to establish an online community based radio, active sports teams and cultural and extra curricular opportunities for primary children
Several members  and students have gotten the opportunity to improve their lives through the concentrated effort  of the community on encouraging the importance of self education and entrepreneurship.

See also
Notable protests in South Africa

References

Johannesburg Region C
Townships in Gauteng